Stanley Chapman Pickard, OBE (4 July 1910 – 31 March 1988) was the eighth Bishop of Lebombo from 1958 until 1969.

He was  ordained  in  1938 and his first post was as a curate at St Catherine's, New Cross. He became a UMCA missionary, rising in time to be Archdeacon of Portuguese East Africa. In 1958 he was elevated to the episcopate, serving for a decade.  After this he was Rector of St John's, Belgravia before retirement in 1983.

Notes

1910 births
English Anglican missionaries
Anglican archdeacons in Africa
20th-century Anglican Church of Southern Africa bishops
Anglican bishops of Lebombo
Commanders of the Order of the British Empire
1988 deaths
Anglican missionaries in Mozambique